Acrocercops insulariella is a moth of the family Gracillariidae. It is known from the United States (California).

The larvae feed on Chrysolepis chrysophylla, Chrysolepis sempervirens, Quercus agrifolia, Quercus chrysolepis, Quercus garryana, Quercus tomentella, Quercus vaccinifolia and Quercus wislizeni. They probably mine the leaves of their host plant.

References

External links
 mothphotographersgroup

insulariella
Moths of North America
Moths described in 1971